Time Orders Old Age to Destroy Beauty is a 1746 allegorical oil on canvas painting by the Italian artist Pompeo Batoni. It was commissioned from him by Bartolomeo Talenti, a collector from Lucca, as a pendant for La lascivia, now in the Hermitage Museum. It shows personifications of Time as an old man with a scythe, Old Age as an old woman and Beauty as a young woman. It came into the collection of the Russian count Nikolai Alexandrovich Kushelev-Bezborodko, before being acquired in 1961 by the National Gallery, London where it now hangs.

History 
The painting was commissioned from Batoni by Bartolomeo Talenti, a Lucchese collector, as a counterpart to La lascivia, now preserved in the Hermitage in St. Petersburg. It entered the collection of the Russian Count Gregori Kushelev-Bezborodko and was finally acquired by the National Gallery in 1961.

References

Paintings by Pompeo Batoni
18th-century allegorical paintings
Allegorical paintings by Italian artists
1746 paintings
Collections of the National Gallery, London